Landmark Cases: Historic Supreme Court Decisions is a series first aired by C-SPAN in the fall of 2015 about 12 key cases argued in front of the U.S. Supreme Court. A second season aired in the winter and spring of 2018, in which 12 additional cases were discussed. Each episode is 90 minutes long, airs live, and examines a specific case in detail. The series is hosted by Susan Swain, and episodes typically feature two legal scholars discussing the case, video footage from locations pertinent to the case, and questions and comments from viewers. C-SPAN produced the series in conjunction with the National Constitution Center.

Supreme Court journalist Tony Mauro wrote companion books for each season, which were published by C-SPAN and CQ Press. They drew on Mauro's earlier book Illustrated Great Decisions of the Supreme Court.

Table of episodes

Note: Kannon Shanmugam had originally been scheduled to appear on this program, but was replaced by Rosen.

References

External links

Discussion of Landmark Cases and the cases discussed therein, hosted by Jeffrey Rosen, September 16, 2015
Q&A interview with Tony Mauro about the companion book for Landmark Cases, October 4, 2015
Landmark Cases Second Season Launch; Discussion with Jeffrey Rosen, Akhil Amar, and Michael Paulsen, February 19, 2018

C-SPAN original programming
2015 American television series debuts
2015 American television series endings
2018 American television series debuts

American television talk shows
History of the Supreme Court of the United States
Lists of United States Supreme Court cases
2010s American legal television series